It's your Thing is an independently filmed 1970 concert film funded by The Isley Brothers. The film was directed by Mike Gargiulo and the production was supervised by Betty Sperber.

Concert 
The concert was filmed at Yankee Stadium in the Bronx, New York on June 21, 1969. It was recorded and subsequently released as a live album titled Live at Yankee Stadium on T-Neck Records in October 1969. Ike & Tina Turner who are featured in the film are not included on the live album because they didn't not participate in the original concert. Their segment was filmed separately in 1970 and added to the film.

List of performers 

 The Isley Brothers
 Patty Austin
 Five Stair Steps and Cubie
 The Edwin Hawkins Singers
 Jackie "Moms" Mabley
 Clara Ward Singers
 Judy White
 The Young Gents
 The Brooklyn Bridge
 The Winstons
Ike & Tina Turner

Release 
It's your Thing was released by Medford Films in theaters in Chicago, New York and Los Angeles on August 21, 1970. Mayor John V. Lindsay of New York attended a special preview of the film a day before its release. Proceeds from the New York premiere went to the Mayor's Commission on Youth and Physical Fitness.

The film has not been released on home video. The UCLA Film & Television Archive has a non-circulating "research and student center" copy of this film on VHS and 35 mm reels.

References

External links 

 
 It's Your Thing on British Film Institute

Documentary films about pop music and musicians
1970 films
Concert films
American documentary films
American independent films
African-American musical films
1970s American films